Polygrapha cyanea is a butterfly of the family Nymphalidae. It is known from Peru, Ecuador and Colombia.

Subspecies
Polygrapha cyanea cyanea (Ecuador)
Polygrapha cyanea silvaorum Constantino & Salazar, 1998 (Colombia)

References

Anaeini
Nymphalidae of South America
Taxa named by Frederick DuCane Godman
Taxa named by Osbert Salvin
Butterflies described in 1868